Plymouth is a populated place located in Carroll County, Missouri, United States. Plymouth is four miles south of Ludlow and five miles east of Braymer.

History
Plymouth was laid out in 1881. The community was named after Plymouth, Massachusetts. A post office called Plymouth was established in 1877, and remained in operation until 1908.

References

Unincorporated communities in Carroll County, Missouri
Unincorporated communities in Missouri